Ninashanca is a mostly rocky mountain in the north of the Huayhuash mountain range in the Andes of Peru,  high. It is located in the Huánuco Region, Bolognesi Province, Pacllón District, and in the Lauricocha Province, Queropalca District, northwest of the lake Ninacocha. It is a mountain very rarely climbed. Base camp can be reached from the village of Chiquian in five days of trek.

The normal route is rated D and can be climbed from Mitococha by the NE ridge, gained by a 45° snow couloir then a short rock pitch followed by the corniced ridge.

See also 
 Jirishanca
 Rasac

Sources 

Mountains of Peru
Mountains of Huánuco Region